Mentha suaveolens, the apple mint, pineapple mint, woolly mint or round-leafed mint (synonyms M. rotundifolia, Mentha macrostachya, Mentha insularis), is a member of the mint family Lamiaceae.  It is native to southern and western Europe including the Mediterranean region. It is a herbaceous, upright perennial plant that is most commonly grown as a culinary herb or for ground cover.

Description
They are somewhat hairy on top and downy underneath with serrated edges. Apple mint flowers in mid to late summer. The plant is aromatic with a fruity, minty flavour.

Distribution
Apple mint is native to southern and western Europe and is naturalised in central and northern parts of Europe. It is found in damp and wet locations.

Cultivation and uses

An attractive herb, apple mint is often used as an ornamental plant. It is hardy and easy to grow, preferring full sun to lightly shady conditions. The leaves of this plant can be used to make apple mint jelly, as well as a flavoring in dishes such as apple mint couscous. It is also often used to make a mint tea, as a garnish, or in salads.

Pineapple mint (Mentha suaveolens 'Variegata') is a cultivar of apple mint that has leaves which are banded with white. A hybrid derived from it is grapefruit mint (Mentha suaveolens × piperata).

Apple mint has been used for medicinal purposes for thousands of years in many parts of the world, including Africa, Europe, Asia, and the Americas.

References

External links

 

suaveolens
Garden plants
Herbs
Flora of Europe
Plants described in 1792
Taxa named by Jakob Friedrich Ehrhart